The Houston Astros' 1987 season was a season in American baseball. It involved the Houston Astros attempting to win the National League West.

Offseason
 October 24, 1986: Matt Keough was released by the Astros.
 October 24, 1986: John Mizerock was released by the Houston Astros.
 November 16, 1986: Rocky Childress was purchased by the Astros from the Philadelphia Phillies.

Regular season
 May 1, 1987: Pitcher Nolan Ryan hit a home run off of Atlanta Braves pitcher Charlie Puleo.
 August 31, 1987: Astros batter Billy Hatcher was batting against the Chicago Cubs when he broke his bat and it flew down the third base line. Cubs third baseman Keith Moreland saw cork, and Hatcher was suspended for 10 games. Later on, Hatcher claimed that he was using pitcher Dave Smith's bat, and not his own.
 September 9, 1987: Nolan Ryan struck out Mike Aldrete for the 4500th strikeout in his career.

Season standings

Record vs. opponents

Notable transactions
 April 2, 1987: Jeff Calhoun was traded by the Houston Astros to the Philadelphia Phillies for Ronn Reynolds.
 June 2, 1987: 1987 Major League Baseball draft
Craig Biggio was drafted by the Astros in the 1st round (22nd pick). Player signed June 8, 1987.
Darryl Kile was drafted by the Astros in the 30th round. Player signed May 18, 1988.
 June 2, 1987: Eric Bullock was traded by the Astros to the Minnesota Twins for Clay Christiansen.

Roster

Player stats

Batting

Starters by position
Note: Pos = Position; G = Games played; AB = At bats; H = Hits; Avg. = Batting average; HR = Home runs; RBI = Runs batted in

Other batters
Note: G = Games played; AB = At bats; H = Hits; Avg. = Batting average; HR = Home runs; RBI = Runs batted in

Pitching

Starting pitchers
Note: G = Games pitched; IP = Innings pitched; W = Wins; L = Losses; ERA = Earned run average; SO = Strikeouts

Other pitchers
Note: G = Games pitched; IP = Innings pitched; W = Wins; L = Losses; ERA = Earned run average; SO = Strikeouts

Relief pitchers
Note: G = Games pitched; W = Wins; L = Losses; SV = Saves; ERA = Earned run average; SO = Strikeouts

Farm system

References

External links
1987 Houston Astros season at Baseball Reference

Houston Astros seasons
Houston Astros season
Houston Astros